Alcanivoracaceae is a family of Pseudomonadota. Cells of the species are rod-shaped.

References

Oceanospirillales